Rafael Candelas Salinas (born 21 November 1969) is a Mexican politician affiliated with the Party of the Democratic Revolution. He served as Deputy of the LIX Legislature of the Mexican Congress representing Zacatecas as replacement of Amalia García, and previously served as a local deputy in the LVI Legislature of the Congress of Zacatecas.

References

1969 births
Living people
Politicians from Zacatecas City
Party of the Democratic Revolution politicians
Universidad Autónoma de Guadalajara alumni
Members of the Congress of Zacatecas
20th-century Mexican politicians
21st-century Mexican politicians
Deputies of the LIX Legislature of Mexico
Members of the Chamber of Deputies (Mexico) for Zacatecas